The 2015–16 season is Levski Sofia's 95th season in the First League. This article shows player statistics and all matches (official and friendly) that the club has played during the season.

Transfers

In

Total spending: €0.38M

Out

Total income: €0

Net income: -€0.38M

Loans out

Squad

Updated on 28 May 2016.

Performance overview

Fixtures

Friendlies

Summer

Mid-season

Winter

A Group

League table

Results summary

Results by round

Matches

Bulgarian Cup

Squad statistics

References

PFC Levski Sofia seasons
Levski Sofia